Dračevo (Cyrillic script: Драчево) may refer to any of the following settlements within the former Yugoslavia:

Dračevo, Čapljina - Bosnia and Herzegovina
Dračevo, Trebinje - Bosnia and Herzegovina
Dračevo, Skopje - Republic of North Macedonia